Mustafa Suzan (born 5 April 1957) is a Turkish wrestler. He competed in the men's Greco-Roman 82 kg at the 1984 Summer Olympics.

References

External links
 

1957 births
Living people
Turkish male sport wrestlers
Olympic wrestlers of Turkey
Wrestlers at the 1984 Summer Olympics
Place of birth missing (living people)